A prison escape  (referred as a bust out, breakout, jailbreak, or prison break) is the act of an inmate leaving prison through unofficial or illegal ways. Normally, when this occurs, an effort is made on the part of authorities to recapture them and return them to their original detainers. Escaping from prison is also a criminal offense in some countries, such as the United States and Canada, and it is highly likely to result in time being added to the inmate's sentence, as well as the inmate being placed under increased security that is most likely a maximum security prison or supermax prison. In  Germany, and a number of other countries, it is considered human nature to want to escape from a prison and it is considered as a violation of the right of freedom, so escape is not penalized in itself (in the absence of other factors such as threats of violence, actual violence, or property damage).

Many prisons use security features such as CCTV, perimeter sensors, barred windows, high walls, barbed wire, razor wire, and electric fencing to prevent escapes.

Methods
Numerous methods have been used to escape from prisons over time. Many escapes have been successfully conducted by inmates who have invented their own methods. Weaknesses that are found as prisoners escape are often corrected at numerous prisons around the world to prevent future escapes in a similar manner. This leads inmates to finding new ways.

Since prisoners usually have a lot of time in which they are doing nothing, this gives them plenty of time to think, allowing them to devise plans and figure out ways to escape.

The following are methods that have commonly been used by prisoners in escapes. In some instances, a combination of these are used.

Cell escape
While some prisoners are allowed out of their cells at times, others remain locked in their cells most of the time, particularly those in solitary confinement. Many prisoners who are kept in their cells must find ways out of the cells. Even those who are allowed out of their cells at times still have plans that involve escape from their cells.

Cell escapes occur through either the door, the window, the light, the ventilation system, by breaking down the walls, or by tunneling underground.

Some prisoners have escaped by picking the locks on their cells, creating keys to their cells, sawing bars off of the doors or windows, carving away the walls, or breaking away the vent.

Containment penetration
Containment penetration involves breaking down or slipping through the physical containment of the prison, including that of the cell itself or the surrounding complex. Methods include the destruction of the cell or compound walls, squeezing through tight spaces, or entering off-limits areas. Prisoners often destroy their containment with homemade tools, smuggled objects, or other contraband.

Most prisons are contained on the outside by one or more fences, often topped with barbed wire or razor wire. Escapees manage to scale these fences successfully or cut holes in the fences, damaging them. These fences are also watched by one or more guards from a tower, but escapees manage to pass the fence when the guard is turned away, unable to see in the dark, or sleeping on the job. Outside the fences is often a perimeter patrol conducted by an officer in a vehicle, which stands as the final line of defense. Escapees manage to evade this by studying the length of time between passes, waiting until it is on the other side, or using the cover of darkness.

An uncommon method that has been used at times involves the digging of a tunnel under the facility that exits outside the facility.

Physical force
Physical force involves attacking guards with blunt force, homemade weapons, smuggled weapons, or weapons stolen from overpowered guards.

Some escapes involve one or more inmates taking over an entire unit or section of the prison, subduing guards, and stealing weapons or other objects they can use to their advantage.

Deception
Deception may involve fooling one or more guards into believing the prisoner is authorized to depart prison grounds for a legitimate reason, or the prisoner disguising himself or herself as a worker or civilian who can exit prison grounds without arousing suspicion, or the creation of a ruse to mislead guards.

In some escapes, inmates construct makeshift dummies to make guards believe they are in their cells, usually in bed, when they are not. This enables the inmate to gain a head start from the prison before guards discover they are actually missing. Such dummies are typically constructed quite crudely, often using the inmate's or another's hair, shoes, and miscellaneous materials for stuffing, hidden under a blanket to give the appearance a body is present.

Exploitation of weaknesses
Finding holes in the security of the facility, and taking advantage of them. This may include the discovery of overlooked security issues, or taking advantage of guards who are not following policies or procedures, or are otherwise not doing their jobs properly.

Exploitation of corruption
Taking advantage of intentional wrongdoing on part of prison staff. This may include the use of weapons or other contraband smuggled in by staff, or receiving assistance from staff who assist due to their personal initiative or by other means of compensation.

Failure to return
Some lower security inmates are permitted to leave prison grounds temporarily on the honor they will return. These include those who depart for employment outside the facility or furloughs that allow time outside for periods of time.

Escape from outside
Breaking while in custody outside facility grounds. Prisoners are often transported for work duties, to be moved between facilities, attend court hearings, for hospitalization and medical appointments, and other reasons.

Outside help
Receiving aid from an accomplice outside prison walls, including those who provide a ride to the inmate following their penetration, smuggle in contraband as visitors, or use helicopters, among other methods.

When a banned item is smuggled, it can either be slipped through or tossed over the fence from outside, hidden in a gift to the inmate that is legal, or slipped past corrupt security officers. In some cases, the staff are the source of the smuggling themselves.

Escape from island prisons
Escaping from an island prison brings another challenge of crossing the water to free land. This can be done by construction of a makeshift raft or receiving outside help from the owner of a boat. In the famed 1962 Alcatraz escape, a makeshift raft from raincoats was confirmed. One additional theory is that a boat was used to transport them in the water.

Prevention
Prevention of prison escape includes the numerous security measures that are in effect. How many and which measures are used depends on the security level and specific institution. Some of the preventive measures are:

Structural

 One or more fences surrounding the facility
 Barbed wire or razor wire on topping fences that surround the facility
 Razor wire on the ground between fences, thereby making one's presence in this area dangerous and possibly deadly
 Multiple locked doors between the "pods" (sections of cells) and the exit
 Cell windows made too narrow for a human body to fit through; iron bars are often fitted

Guard placement

 Rounds: Guards within the facility make rounds checking inmates at set intervals 
 Full-time watch: High-risk inmates are watched non-stop around the clock one-on-one
 Guard towers: Guards in towers at corners of compound can observe edges of the facility and are often authorized to use deadly force against fleeing escapees
 Perimeter patrol: A guard in a vehicle circles the compound from the outside, watching for escaping inmates

Technology
 Surveillance cameras allow guards to monitor areas of the compound without being physically present
 Security lighting provides nighttime visibility of exterior areas, including entrances, exercise yards and perimeter fencing
 Microwave or buried RF sensors alert security if an inmate nears the fence or has entered a sterile area (protected area, such as the space between a pair of parallel fences, in which inmates are not allowed).
 Thermal cameras detect heat signatures and can notify guards if an inmate (or other unauthorized person) is present in a restricted area or moving towards the fence 
Video analytics that detect, track and classify people, objects, and vehicles near the perimeter 
 Alarms, buzzers, or sirens make guards aware if any doors or gates are open, signifying a possible breach
 Perimeter intrusion detection systems sound an alarm if fences are climbed or cut. Some systems also provide guards with live audio feedback

Routine
 Head counts at set times to ensure the number of inmates in the facility matches the number on record
 Cell searches to make sure inmates do not have contraband that can be used to aid an escape or commit violence against guards or other inmates

Punishment
In some jurisdictions, including the United States, escaping from jail or prison is a criminal offense. In Virginia, for instance, the punishment for escape depends on whether the offender escaped by using force or violence or setting fire to the jail, and the seriousness of the offense for which they were imprisoned.

In Russia, escaping from prison is an offence that can result in up to four years being added to the inmate's sentence.

In Belgium, Germany, the Netherlands, Sweden, Austria and other countries, the philosophy of the law holds that it is human nature to want to escape. In those countries, escapees who do not break any other laws are not charged and no extra time is added to their sentence.

Famous historical escapes

Helicopter escapes

Prisoner of war escapes

See also
Escape tunnel
Fugitive
Manhunt (law enforcement)
Prison film
Prison literature
Prison riot

Footnotes

External links

 
Prison-related crime